Retro Bowl is an 8 bit styled American football video game developed by New Star Games for the iOS, Android, and Nintendo Switch operating systems. A browser version is also officially available on the websites Poki and Kongregate. The game was released in January 2020 and due to its exposure on TikTok, it massively increased in popularity in late 2021. A version for the Nintendo Switch released on February 10, 2022.

Retro Bowl was heavily influenced by the Tecmo Bowl series.  Retro Bowl was the number-one-downloaded-app on Apple's App Store in late 2021. After the success of Retro Bowl, the developers released the association football game Retro Goal in June 2021. Retro Bowl uses simple mechanics which have been praised by players and critics alike.

Gameplay 
Retro Bowl emulates the gameplay of American football and was heavily influenced by the Tecmo Bowl series. In Retro Bowl, the player controls the team's offense while also acting as the team's general manager. Even though the player can draft defensive players or get defensive players from free agency, the defense is not playable, and is simulated by the game. The goal of the game is for the player to manage their team to the titular Retro Bowl championship game. The game also includes aspects of managing an American football team such as trading and cutting players, signing free agents, maintaining morale, drafting players, and more. There is also, for $1, an "unlimited version" which gives access to editing any team's uniforms, logos and end zones, weather, and more. The player can also buy Retro Bowl's currency called coaching credits, which can also be earned by game play. All teams are based on the NFL teams in real life, but since EA still has the exclusive NFL license to the actual teams and players, Retro Bowl makes a similar jersey to the team, and puts the city's name instead of the team's name to make up for the lack of NFL license.(For example, Philadelphia instead of the Philadelphia Eagles.)

In April 2022, an update was released that introduced being able to return kickoffs.

In October 2022, another update to the game was released where it was made possible to simulate games and be able to change avatars for players and staff.

In February 2023, another update to the game was released where Retro Bowl added a new mode called "Exhibition Mode" to allow players to pick 2 of any of the 32 NFL teams and play a game whether against the CPU or with a friend.

Reception 
Retro Bowl received "generally favorable" reviews according to review aggregator Metacritic.

Nintendo Life gave the game 9/10, praising the simple mechanics and retro feel of the game but criticized the game's amount of turnovers.

Open Critic puts Retro Bowl in the 95th percentile, complimenting the game's nostalgic feel and its simple interface.

Retro Bowl has been at times the number one game on the Apple App Store, toting close to 1,000,000 reviews.

References 

Android (operating system) games
2020 video games
IOS games
Nintendo Switch games
Retro-style video games
Video game clones
Video games developed in the United Kingdom